William Albert Vincent (born 16 April 1957) is a New Zealand judoka. He competed at the 1984 Summer Olympics and the 1988 Summer Olympics. In 1986, he won the bronze medal in the 78kg weight category at the judo demonstration sport event as part of the 1986 Commonwealth Games.

References

External links
 

1957 births
Living people
New Zealand male judoka
Olympic judoka of New Zealand
Judoka at the 1984 Summer Olympics
Judoka at the 1988 Summer Olympics
People from Kawakawa, New Zealand